House of Councillors elections were held in Japan on 8 July 1956, electing half the seats in the House plus two vacant seats in the other half. The Liberal Democratic Party won the most seats, but failed to win a majority. It was the first national election under the 1955 System, approximately a two party system of Ichirō Hatoyama's Liberal Democratic Party (LDP) that was created in the "conservative merger" of 1955 and Suzuki Mosaburō's reunified Japan Socialist Party (JSP). The later dominant LDP failed to win a majority.

A key campaign issue was Prime Minister Ichirō Hatoyama's plan to revise Article 9 of the constitution – any change of the constitution requires a two-thirds majority in both chambers of the Diet. The left parties aimed to win at least a third of seats to prevent any constitutional change. Another issue was the government's plan to replace the elected prefectural boards of education with appointed ones, a plan fiercely opposed by the left: In June 1956, on the LDP's request the police intervened in the "deliberations" in the Diet when Socialist Councillors resorted to violence.

Results
Two by-elections for the class of Councillors elected in 1953 were held simultaneously: The candidates with the 51st and 52nd highest vote shares in the national vote (one Socialist and one Liberal Democrat) were elected for three-year terms. Takenaka Tsuneo, who was elected as a member of the Japan Dentists' Federation, later joined the LDP.

By constituency

See also
Hatomander

References
Time, July 23, 1956: Japan: Swing to the Left
 The Senkyo election archive: Full results of the 1956 Councillors elections by electoral district

Japan
House of Councillors (Japan) elections
1956 elections in Japan
July 1956 events in Asia
Election and referendum articles with incomplete results